The Landsmannschaft der Buchenlanddeutschen ("Territorial Association of Bukovina Germans", "Homeland Association of Bukovina Germans") was an organization of German refugees expelled from their homes in Bukovina and Bessarabia after World War II. These groups of ethnic Germans are collectively known as Bukovina Germans and Bessarabia Germans respectively. It ceased its activity in 2020. The organization was based in the city of Augsburg, Swabia, Bavaria, south-eastern Germany, and was founded in 1949.

See also 

 Expulsion of Germans after World War II
 Federation of Expellees
 Flight and expulsion of Germans (1944–1950)
 Soviet occupation of Bessarabia and northern Bukovina
 Germans of Romania

Landsmannschaften